Belleruth Naparstek (December 25, 1942, Boston, Massachusetts) is an American social worker, author, teacher and the producer of a guided imagery library of self-administered audio programs.

She did her undergraduate and graduate work at University of Chicago in social work, and then worked in hospitals and clinics, then taught at Case Western Reserve University. She eventually developed guided imagery tapes, which have been used in some hospitals and clinics that have adopted alternative medicine practices as adjuvant therapies.

Naparstek teaches Guided Imagery on the faculty of the University of Arizona Center for Integrative Medicine's post doctoral Fellowship Program.

Books

References

Further reading

1942 births
Living people
American self-help writers
People in alternative medicine
American social workers
Writers from Cleveland
University of Chicago School of Social Service Administration alumni
Case Western Reserve University faculty
University of Arizona faculty